Alan John Carpenter (born 4 January 1957) is a former Australian politician who served as the 28th Premier of Western Australia, from 2006 to 2008. From Albany, Carpenter graduated from the University of Western Australia, and worked as a journalist before entering politics. A member of the Labor Party, he was first elected to the Legislative Assembly at the 1996 state election, representing the seat of Willagee. In the Gallop ministry, which took office following the 2001 election, Carpenter was Minister for Education (later Education and Training), as well as holding several other portfolios. He replaced Geoff Gallop as premier in January 2006, following Gallop's resignation, but Labor lost office following a hung parliament at the 2008 election, with Colin Barnett becoming premier as the leader of a minority Liberal Party government. Carpenter resigned from parliament in 2009, and until 2018 held a senior management position with Wesfarmers.

Education
Carpenter was born in Albany, Western Australia, was educated at Mount Lockyer Primary School then Albany Senior High School.  After graduating in 1974, he travelled Australia, working a variety of different jobs before returning in 1977 to study political science at the University of Western Australia and graduated in 1980.

Media career
Carpenter began working for the Albany Advertiser as a journalist.  In 1982 he travelled overseas, spending 11 months in Asia and then moving to Europe, where he worked in various jobs for three years.  He returned to Australia in 1986, and began working for the Perth television station TVW-7 as a reporter on politics within the state.  In 1990 Carpenter moved to the ABC, continuing his role as state political reporter in his new job.  He moved up through the ranks in the ABC, becoming the Western Australian presenter of The 7.30 Report in 1992 (succeeding Liam Bartlett in the role), and moving on to become the first presenter of Stateline in 1996.

Politics
He resigned from the ABC in 1996 to begin a career in politics, and was preselected by the ALP to run for the new seat of Willagee, which he won.  During his time in parliament he was shadow minister for disability services, sport & recreation, family & children's services, education, drugs, and as a member of the government, minister for education, sport & recreation, indigenous affairs, education and training, state development, and energy in the Gallop ministry.

When Geoff Gallop resigned due to illness in January 2006, Carpenter quickly emerged as the leading candidate to succeed him as premier. With the decisions of potential rivals Jim McGinty and Michelle Roberts to withdraw from the race, he was elected unopposed by the Labor caucus on 24 January.

After November 2006, Carpenter removed three cabinet ministers in four months for impropriety involving former WA Premier Brian Burke, exposed by the Corruption and Crime Commission. Nevertheless, Carpenter's "no-nonsense" approach in dealing with this issue attracted a 60% public approval rating in opinion polls in late March 2007 (making him one of Australia's most popular state leaders, along with South Australian Premier Mike Rann).

Late 2007 saw dissatisfaction with Carpenter rising and satisfaction falling. Two party preferred polling of 49 percent for Labor was a swing against them. In what proved to be a harbinger for Carpenter, Western Australia was the only state that recorded a swing to the Coalition at the 2007 federal election.  The federal election came at a bad time for the Carpenter government; despite Labor's resounding victory nationwide, it actually lost two of its seats in Western Australia to the Liberals.  However, Liberal Party leader Paul Omodei was experiencing rising levels of dissatisfaction and a stagnant and low satisfaction rating. On the preferred premier measure, Carpenter out-polled Omodei 63–13.

Carpenter called a state election the day after opposition leader Troy Buswell stood aside for former Opposition Leader Colin Barnett, following a number of scandals involving Buswell. In a break with longstanding tradition, the election was set for 6 September 2008, five months earlier than it was due.

During the election campaign, Carpenter promised a ban on uranium mining in Western Australia if elected, reversing previous ALP policy, the ALP having rejected a Greens-initiated bill to ban uranium mining in April 2008.

The election saw a substantial swing in most seats away from Labor, towards the Liberal and Greens parties, resulting in a hung parliament.  While Labor remained the largest  party, it was two seats short of a majority.  Under pressure to resign as Parliamentary Labor leader, Carpenter began negotiations with the National Party with a view to forming a minority government.  However, the Nationals ultimately decided to support the Liberals in forming a minority government. As a result, Alan Carpenter was succeeded by Colin Barnett as Western Australian Premier, and stepped down as Labor leader in favour of his deputy, Eric Ripper.

On 25 September 2009, Carpenter announced his retirement from politics, effective 2 October 2009.

His political legacy came to the fore in 2022 with the low prices for gas which he negotiated for Western Australians being compared to soaring prices in the Eastern States.

Post-political career
Carpenter joined Australia's largest private sector employer Wesfarmers as executive general manager for corporate affairs in late 2009. He retired in 2018.

Personal life
Carpenter is married and has four daughters. Carpenter is an atheist.

See also
 Carpenter Ministry

References

External links

 Wesfarmers's corporate profile

University of Western Australia alumni
1957 births
ABC News (Australia) presenters
Members of the Western Australian Legislative Assembly
Premiers of Western Australia
Living people
Journalists from Western Australia
People from Albany, Western Australia
Australian republicans
Australian Labor Party members of the Parliament of Western Australia
Wesfarmers people
ABC News and Current Affairs
Energy Ministers of Western Australia
21st-century Australian politicians
Australian atheists
Australian political scientists